The Nangatara are an Aboriginal Australian people of Western Australia.

Country
Their northwestern boundary lay halfway between the Percival Lakes and Joanna Springs.

Lifestyle
Given the scarcity of water, with only some available in distant wells and rock catchment areas, when drought struck, the Nangatara would trek to Karbardi, south of Adverse Well In drought times they seek water. The heartland of their territory was Rama, a type of hard gravel plain which they called laribuka.

History
Even before contact with whites, the Nangatara were pushing northwards along the Canning Stock Route, as the Walmadjari withdrew from that part of their territory.

Alternative names
 Nangadjara
 Njangadjara
 Julbaritja (an exonym of the Njangamarda and Mangala,  meaning 'southerners')
 Yulbari-dja, Julbaridja
 Ilbaridja
 Nanidjara (scornful term of abuse used by the Wanman people for them, just as other tribes applied it also the Wanman)
 Nangi
 Mangai
 Mangi

Citations

Sources

Aboriginal peoples of Western Australia
Canning Stock Route
Mid West (Western Australia)